Flying machine is an archaic, early term for an aircraft.

The term flying machine  may also refer to:

Flying Machines s.r.o., Czech aircraft manufacturer

Film and literature 
"The Flying Machine" (short story) (1953), by Ray Bradbury
The Flying Machine (film) (2011), starring Heather Graham

Music 
The Flying Machine (band), British pop group, late 1960s, known for "Smile a Little Smile For Me" 
The Flying Machine, U.S.-American band with James Taylor, that released the single "Night Owl" in 1967
James Taylor and the Original Flying Machine, a compilation album
"Flying Machine", 1971 single by Cliff Richard
"Flying Machine", song by The Stairs from their 1992 album Mexican R'n'B

See also 
 Aircraft
 History of aviation